Thryptomene repens is a species of flowering plant in the family Myrtaceae and is endemic to a restricted area in the west of Western Australia. It is a prostrate shrub with egg-shaped leaves with the narrower end towards the base, and flowers with pink sepals and petals and ten stamens.

Description
Thryptomene repens is a prostrate, widely-spreading shrub that forms roots at the nodes. Flowering occurs from August to September.

Taxonomy
Thryptomene repens was first formally described in 2014 by Barbara Lynette Rye and Malcolm Eric Trudgen in the journal Nuytsia from specimens collected by Alex George on Dirk Hartog Island in 1972. The specific epithet (repens) means "creeping", referring to the prostrate habit of this species.

Distribution and habitat
This thryptomene grows in coastal habitats on Dirk Hartog Island and at Steep Point, the most westerly point of the Australian mainland.

Conservation status
Thryptomene repens is classified as "Priority Two" by the Western Australian Government Department of Parks and Wildlife meaning that it is poorly known and from only one or a few locations.

References

repens
Endemic flora of Western Australia
Endangered flora of Australia
Rosids of Western Australia
Plants described in 2014
Taxa named by Malcolm Eric Trudgen
Taxa named by Barbara Lynette Rye